The Iloilo Flood Control Project (IFCP) is a project of the Department of Public Works and Highways (DPWH) in Iloilo City, Philippines. The project aims to reduce flood damage, which has been an almost yearly occurrence. Financed by the Japan Bank for International Cooperation (JBIC), the project is being implemented in two stages. The first stage is being handled by China International Water & Electric Corp., the second by Hanjin Heavy Industries Co. Ltd. of Korea.

Flood control projects
History of Iloilo City
Flood control in the Philippines